Jeelan Central College, Panadura (commonly known as Panadura Jeelan Central College or simply as Jeelan)located in Panadura. It was founded in 1900 as Quran Madrasa by three of the most prominent Sri Lankan Muslims of the day, M. C. Siddi Lebbe I. L. M. Abdul Aziz and Arasi Marikar Wapchie Marikar, with the active patronage of Ahmed Orabi Pasha of Egypt. It is currently the largest Muslim educational institution in Sri Lanka with more than 2000 students studying there.

Schools in Panadura